The men's team épée was one of seven fencing events on the fencing at the 1936 Summer Olympics programme. It was the seventh appearance of the event. The competition was held from 7 August 1936 to 8 August 1936. 108 fencers from 21 nations competed. Each team could have a maximum of six fencers, with four participating in any given match.

The competition format continued the pool play round-robin from prior years. Each of the four fencers from one team would face each of the four from the other, for a total of 16 bouts per match. Individual bouts were to 3 touches. Individual bouts awarded 2 points to the victor's team, or 1 point to each team if the individual bout was a 3–3 tie. The team with more points won the match, with competition potentially stopping when one team reached 17 points out of the possible 32, if further competition was not necessary to determine tie-breakers for advancement. If the points were tied at 16, touches received was used to determine the winning team. Pool matches unnecessary to the result were not played.

Rosters

Argentina
 Raúl Saucedo
 Luis Lucchetti
 Antonio Villamil
 Roberto Larraz
 Héctor Lucchetti

Austria
 Karl Hanisch
 Hans Schönbaumsfeld
 Roman Fischer
 Hugo Weczerek
 Rudolf Weber

Belgium
 Raymond Stasse
 Robert T'Sas
 Charles Debeur
 Hervé, Count du Monceau de Bergendael
 Jean Plumier
 Marcel Heim

Brazil
 Moacyr Dunham
 Ricardo Vagnotti
 Henrique de Aguilar
 Ennio de Oliveira

Canada
 Don Collinge
 Ernest Dalton
 Charles Otis
 George Tully

Chile
 Ricardo Romero
 César Barros
 Tomas Barraza
 Julio Moreno
 Tomás Goyoaga

Czechoslovakia
 Robert Bergmann
 František Vohryzek
 Bohuslav Kirchmann
 Josef Kunt
 Alfred Klausnitzer
 Václav Rais

Denmark
 Erik Hammer Sørensen
 Caspar Schrøder
 Aage Leidersdorff
 Preben Christiansen

Egypt
 Mahmoud Abdin
 Marcel Boulad
 Mauris Shamil
 Hassan Hosni Tawfik
 Anwar Tawfik

France
 Philippe Cattiau
 Bernard Schmetz
 Georges Buchard
 Michel Pécheux
 Henri Dulieux
 Paul Wormser

Germany
 Siegfried Lerdon
 Sepp Uhlmann
 Hans Esser
 Eugen Geiwitz
 Ernst Röthig
 Otto Schröder

Great Britain
 Charles de Beaumont
 Douglas Dexter
 Bert Pelling
 Ian Campbell-Gray
 Terry Beddard
 Bertie Childs

Greece
 Khristos Zalokostas
 Konstantinos Botasis
 Tryfon Triantafyllakos
 Konstantinos Bembis

Hungary
 Jenő Borovszki
 Tibor Székelyhidy
 Béla Bay
 Pál Dunay
 István Bezegh-Huszágh

Italy
 Edoardo Mangiarotti
 Giancarlo Cornaggia-Medici
 Saverio Ragno
 Franco Riccardi
 Giancarlo Brusati
 Alfredo Pezzana

Netherlands
 Nicolaas van Hoorn
 Jan Schepers
 Willem Driebergen
 Cornelis Weber

Poland
 Alfred Staszewicz
 Teodor Zaczyk
 Rajmund Karwicki
 Roman Kantor
 Kazimierz Szempliński
 Antoni Franz

Portugal
 Henrique da Silveira
 Paulo Leal
 António de Menezes
 João Sassetti
 Gustavo Carinhas

Sweden
 Hans Granfelt
 Gösta Almgren
 Hans Drakenberg
 Birger Cederin

Switzerland
 Jean Hauert
 Édouard Fitting
 Frédéric Fitting
 Edmond Göldlin
 Paul de Graffenried
 Charles Hauert

United States
 Frank Righeimer
 Thomas Sands
 Tracy Jaeckel
 Gustave Heiss
 Joe de Capriles
 Andrew Boyd

Results

Round 1
The top two teams in each pool advanced to round 2.

Pool 1
Poland defeated Portugal, 18 points to 14 (9–7). Switzerland defeated Poland on touches received, 32–35, after the points were tied at 16–16 with bouts won 8–8. Portugal defeated Switzerland 9–7 (18–14 on points). Switzerland was eliminated.

Pool 2
The Netherlands defeated Denmark, 18 points to 14, with an 8–6–2 individual bout result. The United States–Denmark match was stopped after 12 of 16 bouts when the Americans reached 18 points, 9–3. The United States did not play the Netherlands, as both advanced while Denmark was eliminated.

Pool 3
Great Britain defeated Chile, 26 points to 6, with a 12–2–2 individual bout result. The France–Chile match was stopped after 9 of 16 bouts when the French team reached 17 points, 8–0–1. France did not play Great Britain, as both advanced while Chile was eliminated.

Pool 4
Egypt defeated Austria, 18 points to 14, with a 9–7 individual bout result. The Sweden–Austria match was stopped after 10 of 16 bouts when the Swedes reached 18 points, 9–1. Sweden did not play Egypt, as both advanced while Austria was eliminated.

Pool 5
Argentina defeated Greece, 26 points to 6, with an 11–1–4 individual bout result. The Belgium–Greece match was stopped after 11 of 16 bouts when the Belgians reached 17 points, 8–2–1. Belgium did not play Argentina, as both advanced while Greece was eliminated.

Pool 6
Czechoslovakia defeated Hungary, 17 points to 15, with an 8–7–1 individual bout result. The Italy–Hungary match was stopped after 11 of 16 bouts when the Italians reached 17 points, 8–2–1. Italy did not play Czechoslovakia, as both advanced while Hungary was eliminated.

Pool 7
Germany defeated Canada, 22 points to 10, with an 11–5 individual bout result. Canada then defeated Brazil, 17–15 points (8–7–1 bouts). The Germany–Brazil match resulted in a German win, 19–13 on points (9–6–1 bouts). This put Germany in first place at 2–0, Canada second at 1–1, and Brazil eliminated in third place at 0–2.

Round 2
The top two teams in each pool advanced to the semifinals.

Pool 1
The United States defeated Czechoslovakia, 20 points to 12 (10–6). Italy also defeated Czechoslovakia, with the match stopped when Italy reached 17 points as it was then clear that Czechoslovakia was eliminated and the other two teams advanced.

Pool 2
Sweden and Egypt were from the same first-round pool, but had not played each other yet. Both of those teams won their first matches, over the Netherlands and Germany, respectively (with Egypt winning on touches received 34–36 in a very close match). Both teams then lost their second matches, with the Sweden–Germany match also very close (Germany winning this time, 17 points to 15 in an 8–7–1 result). This left all four teams at 1–1, with the Sweden–Egypt and Netherlands–Germany matches both being winner-advances. Egypt was unable to win a single bout, with Sweden prevailing at 8–0–1; Germany defeated Netherlands with 9 wins in the first 13 bouts.

Pool 3
Belgium and Argentina advanced from the same first-round pool, but had not yet faced each other. They did so in the first match of this round, with Belgium prevailing on touches received (34–35) after the individual bouts were 8–8. Argentina then lost to Portugal, with the match stopped when Portugal reached 18 points (9–5).

Pool 4
The Poland–Canada match came down to touches received after the bouts were 8–8, which Poland won 35–36. France defeated Great Britain 19 points to 13 (9–6–1). The victors in the first matches also won the second matches, with Poland beating Great Britain 18 points to 8 (13 bouts, 8–3–2) and France prevailing over Canada 26 points to 6 (13–3).

Semifinals
The top two teams in each pool advanced to the final.

Semifinal 1
France and Poland advanced from the same second-round pool, but had not faced each other. France beat Germany and Belgium beat Poland in the first pair of matches. Germany defeated Belgium while France beat Poland in the second pair, putting France at 2–0, Germany and Belgium at 1–1, and Poland at 0–2. Poland's best hope was for a three-way tie for second at 1–2, but was unable to defeat Germany (falling 17 points to 5). France defeated Belgium, eliminating the latter team as well.

Pool 2
Italy and the United States were from the same second-round pool, but had not played each other yet. Italy won in the match between them in the first pairing, with Sweden prevailing over Portugal in the other first pairing. Sweden then defeated the United States and Italy beat Portugal. This left Italy and Sweden at 2–0 while Portugal and the United States were at 0–2, so the third set of matches was not played as unnecessary to determine advancement.

Final
France defeated Germany again, while Italy faced Sweden for the first time and won. In the second set of pairings, Sweden defeated Germany and Italy beat France. This put Italy at 2–0, Sweden and France at 1–1, and Germany at 0–2 (and out of contention for the gold medal). In the final matches, Italy bested Germany without much difficulty (17 points to 4) to give the former the gold medal and the latter fourth place. The match between Sweden and France then became a silver/bronze match. It was as close as could be, with the individual bouts finishing 8–8. Sweden just barely prevailed on touches received, however, winning 31–32 to take silver and give France bronze.

References

Epee team
Men's events at the 1936 Summer Olympics